Pterinochilus is a genus of baboon spiders that was first described by Reginald Innes Pocock in 1897. They are found all throughout Africa

Species 
 it contains ten species, all found in Africa:
Pterinochilus alluaudi Berland, 1914 – Kenya
Pterinochilus andrewsmithi Gallon, 2009 – Kenya
Pterinochilus chordatus (Gerstäcker, 1873) – East Africa
Pterinochilus cryptus Gallon, 2008 – Angola
Pterinochilus lapalala Gallon & Engelbrecht, 2011 – South Africa
Pterinochilus lugardi Pocock, 1900 – Southern, East Africa
Pterinochilus murinus Pocock, 1897 – Angola, Central, East, Southern Africa
Pterinochilus raygabrieli Gallon, 2009 – Kenya
Pterinochilus simoni Berland, 1917 – Angola, Congo
Pterinochilus vorax Pocock, 1897 (type) – Angola, Central, East Africa

In synonymy

Formerly included

See also
 List of Theraphosidae species

References

Theraphosidae genera
Spiders of Africa
Taxa named by R. I. Pocock
Theraphosidae